The bilingual status of gminas (municipalities) in Poland is regulated by the Act of 6 January 2005 on National and Ethnic Minorities and on the Regional Languages, which permits certain gminas with significant linguistic minorities to introduce a second, auxiliary language to be used in official contexts alongside Polish. So far 44 gminas have done this:

Polish/German 

Polish/German bilingual gminas (Gemeinden) in
Opole Voivodeship (28 municipalities)
Gmina Biała / Gemeinde Zülz (since 06.03.2006)
Gmina Bierawa / Gemeinde Birawa (since 23.04.2007)
Gmina Chrząstowice / Gemeinde Chronstau (since 25.01.2006)
Gmina Cisek / Gemeinde Czissek
Gmina Dobrodzień / Gemeinde Guttentag (since 13.05.2009)
Gmina Dobrzeń Wielki / Gemeinde Groß Döbern (since 22.04.2009)
Gmina Głogówek / Gemeinde Oberglogau (since 22.04.2009)
Gmina Gogolin / Gemeinde Gogolin
Gmina Izbicko / Gemeinde Stubendorf (since 06.03.2006)
Gmina Jemielnica / Gemeinde Himmelwitz (since 28.08.2006)
Gmina Kolonowskie / Gemeinde Colonnowska (since 22.09.2006)
Gmina Komprachcice / Gemeinde Comprachtschütz (since 04.06.2009)
Gmina Lasowice Wielkie / Gemeinde Gross Lassowitz (since 18.10.2006)
Gmina Leśnica / Gemeinde Leschnitz (since 17.05.2006)
Gmina Łubniany / Gemeinde Lugnian
Gmina Murów / Gemeinde Murow (since 22.04.2009)
Gmina Pawłowiczki / Gemeinde Gnadenfeld
Gmina Polska Cerekiew / Gemeinde Groß Neukirch
Gmina Popielów / Gemeinde Poppelau
Gmina Prószków / Gemeinde Proskau (since 11.07.2006)
Gmina Radłów / Gemeinde Radlau (since 25.01.2006)
Gmina Reńska Wieś / Gemeinde Reinschdorf (since 26.10.2006)
Gmina Strzeleczki / Gemeinde Klein Strehlitz (since 17.05.2006)
Gmina Tarnów Opolski / Gemeinde Tarnau (since 15.02.2007)
Gmina Turawa / Gemeinde Turawa (since 12.09.2008)
Gmina Ujazd / Gemeinde Ujest (since 28.08.2006)
Gmina Walce / Gemeinde Walzen (since 04.04.2006)
Gmina Zębowice / Gemeinde Zembowitz (since 23.10.2007)
Silesian Voivodeship (3 municipalities)
Gmina Krzanowice / Gemeinde Kranowitz
Gmina Rudnik / Gemeinde Rudnik
Gmina Sośnicowice / Gemeinde Kieferstädtel

Other gminas in Opole Voivodeship and Silesian Voivodeship which would be permitted by the Act to make German an auxiliary language are Olesno and Pawłowiczki.

Polish/Kashubian

Polish/Kashubian bilingual gminas in Pomeranian Voivodeship:
Gmina Linia (Gmina Lëniô; since 23.04.2012)
Gmina Luzino (Gmina Lëzëno; since 21.02.2014)
Gmina Parchowo (Gmina Parchòwò; since 16.08.2006)
Gmina Sierakowice (Gmina Serakòwice; since 23.10.2007)
Gmina Żukowo (Gmina Żukòwò; since 17.07.2013)

Polish/Lithuanian
Polish/Lithuanian bilingual gmina in Podlaskie Voivodeship:
Gmina Puńsk (Punsko valsčius; since 25.05.2006)

Polish/Belarusian

Polish/Belarusian bilingual gmina in Podlaskie Voivodeship:

 Hajnówka-urban gmina (Гайнаўка) on 3 December 2007
 Gmina Czyże (Гміна Чыжы) on 8 February 2010
 Gmina Hajnówka-rural gmina (Гміна Гайнаўка) on 28 May 2010
 Gmina Narewka (Гміна Нараўка) on 16 September 2009
 Gmina Orla (Гміна Орля) on 7 May 2009

Polish/Lemko
Polish/Lemko bilingual names of localities in Małopolskie Voivodeship:
Gmina Gorlice: Bielanka
Gmina Uście Gorlickie: Blechnarka, Gładyszów, Konieczna, Kunkowa, Nowica, Regietów, Ropki, Zdynia

Gallery

References

External links
 Maciej Zych. Minority place names in Poland. United Nations Group of Experts in Geographical Names. Twenty-sixth session. Vienna 2–6 May 2011. Working Paper no. 3.
 List of minority place names in Poland according to Register of the communes where place-names in minority language are used provided by Ministry of Administration and Digitization as of April 9, 2019.

 
 B
Linguistic rights
Languages of Poland
Regions of Europe with multiple official languages